The 2013 Western Kentucky Hilltoppers football team represented Western Kentucky University (WKU) in the 2013 NCAA Division I FBS football season. They were led by first year head coach Bobby Petrino and played their home games at Houchens Industries–L. T. Smith Stadium. They were a member of the Sun Belt Conference. They finished the season 8–4, 4–3 in Sun Belt play to finish in a four-way tie for second place. Despite being bowl eligible, they were not selected to play in a bowl game. This was their last season as a member of the Sun Belt as they moved to Conference USA in the 2014 season.

Schedule

Schedule Source:

References

WKU
Western Kentucky Hilltoppers football seasons
Western Kentucky Hilltoppers football